Bounce or The Bounce may refer to:

 Deflection (physics), the event where an object collides with and bounces against a plane surface

Books
 Mr. Bounce, a character from the Mr. Men series of children's books

Broadcasting, film and TV
 Bounce (film), 2000 film starring Gwyneth Paltrow and Ben Affleck

Radio
 WMGC-FM (105.1 The Bounce), a radio station in Detroit, Michigan
 KZCE (101.1 The Bounce), a radio station in Phoenix, Arizona
 Bounce (radio network), an adult hits radio network in Canada
 CHBN-FM, a radio station in Edmonton, Alberta, Canada, known as 91.7 The Bounce from 2005 - 2017
 CJCH-FM, a radio station in Halifax, Nova Scotia, Canada, known as 101.3 The Bounce from 2008 - 2016

Stage productions
 Bounce (musical), the original title of Road Show, a musical by Stephen Sondheim and John Weidman

Television

Networks
 Bounce TV, a U.S. television network with programming mainly aimed at African Americans

Series
 Bounce (Australian TV series), an Australian sports show airing since 2007, formerly known as Before the Bounce and After the Bounce
 Hit the Floor (TV series), a 2013-2016 VH1 series
 The Bounce (TV series), a 2010 Australian sports show

Episodes
 "Bounce" (NCIS), an episode of NCIS

Games
 Bounces (video game), a 1985 sports/fighting game
 Bounce (mobile game), a mobile game series from Nokia

Music and dance
 Bounce music, a style of hip hop music that originated in New Orleans
 Bouncy techno or bounce, a style of UK rave hardcore dance music

Albums
 Bounce (Bon Jovi album) or the title song (see below), 2002
 Bounce (Terence Blanchard album) or the title song, 2003
 Bounce, by The Beat featuring Ranking Roger, 2016
 Bounce, an EP by JJ Project, or the title song, 2012

Songs
 "Bounce" (Bon Jovi song), 2002
 "Bounce" (Calvin Harris song), 2011
 "Bounce" (Iggy Azalea song), 2013
 "Bounce" (JJ Project song), 2012
 "Bounce" (Samantha Jade song), 2019
 "Bounce" (Sarah Connor song), 2003
 "Bounce" (Tarkan song), 2005
 "Bounce" (Timbaland song), 2008
 "Bounce", by 2 Chainz from ColleGrove
 "Bounce", by Aaron Carter from Aaron's Party (Come Get It)
 "Bounce", by the Cab from Whisper War
 "Bounce", by Charli XCX from XCX World
 "Bounce", by Cho Yong-pil
 "Bounce", by Danko Jones from My Love Is Bold
 "Bounce", by Emphatic
 "Bounce", by Hadouken! from Not Here to Please You
 "Bounce", by the Jonas Brothers
 "Bounce", by Katchafire
 "Bounce", by LMFAO from Party Rock
 "Bounce", by Marshmello from Joytime
 "Bounce", by MSTRKRFT from Fist of God
 "Bounce", by Run–D.M.C. from The Beavis and Butt-head Experience
 "Bounce", by System of a Down from Toxicity
 "Bounce", by Toya from Toya
 "The Bounce", by Jay-Z from The Blueprint 2: The Gift & The Curse

Sports 
 Bounce (golf), a term referring to the shape of the head on certain golf clubs
 Bounce (jump), a type of fence in equestrian events
 Ball-up, or bounce, a method of restarting play in Australian rules football
 Running bounce, a skill in Australian rules
 The Bouncy, a sports celebration particularly associated with Rangers F.C.
 Bouncing ball, which is of interest to many ball sports
 Stone skipping, competitors bounce stones along the surface of water

Technology 
 Bounce (network), an internet networking term for masking connections, or sometimes a synonym for reset when applied as a verb to an internet server
 Bounce message, an automated message sent when e-mail delivery fails
 Bounce rate, the percentage of visitors who enter a website and "bounce" (leave the site) rather than continue viewing other pages within the same site
 Contact bounce, a common problem with mechanical switches and relays
 Ping pong recording technique, or bouncing, a method used in sound recording

Other uses 
 Bounce (banking), to tender a check for which one has non-sufficient funds, or the return of such a check
 Bounce (fabric softener), an American brand of fabric softener and other laundry sheets produced by Procter & Gamble
 Bounce, a dog owned by Alexander Pope
 Bounce, a slang for twerking

See also 
 
 
 Bouncer (disambiguation)